New Blaine is an unincorporated community and census-designated place (CDP) in Logan County, Arkansas, United States. Per the 2020 census, the population was 173.

The following sites listed on the National Register of Historic Places are in or near New Blaine:
Anhalt Barn, on County Road 68
Old Arkansas Highway 22, part of AR 197, AR 197 Loop, and Rainwater Loop
Elizabeth Hall, off AR 22
Farmer's State Bank, at 100 Seallars St.
Freeborn T. Lasater House, at 494 AR 197
Main Street Bridge, 2002 Sellers St. at Silver Smith Branch
New Blaine School, at the junction of AR 22 and Spring Rd.
Troy Lasater Service Station, on the AR 197 Loop.

Geography
The community is in eastern Logan County in the valley of Little Shoal Creek at its inlet to an arm of Lake Dardanelle, an impoundment on the Arkansas River. Arkansas Highway 22 passes through the community, leading east  to Dardanelle and west  to Paris. Highway 197 branches north from Highway 22 in New Blaine, leading north  to the Shoal Bay Recreation Area.

Demographics

2020 census

Note: the US Census treats Hispanic/Latino as an ethnic category. This table excludes Latinos from the racial categories and assigns them to a separate category. Hispanics/Latinos can be of any race.

Education
Paris is in the Paris School District, which operates Paris High School.

References

Census-designated places in Logan County, Arkansas
Census-designated places in Arkansas